Kenneth Bruce Pepper (11 March 1913 – 1 December 2002) was a Commissioner of HM Customs and Excise, 1957–73.

He was educated at Ilford County High School and the London School of Economics.  He then spent his entire career at Customs and Excise apart from a spell as Lieutenant, Intelligence Corps, 1944–5.  He was made a CB in 1965.

1913 births
2002 deaths
Companions of the Order of the Bath
People educated at Ilford County High School
Civil servants in HM Customs and Excise
Intelligence Corps officers
British Army personnel of World War II